Victor Rodrigues da Silva or Victor da Silva (born February 10, 1976) is a Brazilian former footballer who played as defensive midfielder or defender, most recently for Persisko Merangin.

Club career
He played for FC Seoul of the South Korean K League, then known as Anyang LG Cheetahs.

Honours

Club honors
 Champion of Liga Indonesia Premier Division : Persibo Bojonegoro (2009-10)

Individual honors
 Liga Indonesia Premier Division Best player : Persibo Bojonegoro (2009-10)

External links 
 Profile at Liga Indonesia Official Site
 

1976 births
Living people
Brazilian footballers
Brazilian expatriate footballers
FC Seoul players
K League 1 players
Expatriate footballers in South Korea
Liga 1 (Indonesia) players
Expatriate footballers in Indonesia
Association football midfielders
Association football defenders
Footballers from Rio de Janeiro (city)